Kunwar Amarjeet Singh is an Indian contemporary dancer and television actor. He is best known for his portrayal of Reyansh Singhania in the popular dance-based youth show Dil Dosti Dance.

Career
Kunwar Amar began his career as a contestant on Indian dance-based reality TV show "Dance India Dance", in which he became one of the finalists. He then went on to portray the lead role on India's dance-based teen drama Dil Dosti Dance as Reyansh Singhania.

He appeared as a contestant in Dare 2 Dance, a dance-and stunt-based reality show broadcast in September 2014 on Life OK.
He also participated in the reality dance show Nach Baliye 5 with Charlie Chauhan.
He has done episodes for Zing (TV channel)'s Pyaar Tune Kya Kiya (TV series) and Bindass's Yeh Hai Aashiqui. 
He also acted in popular TV show Naamkaran as Aladdin aka Kabir in 2016.

Filmography

Web series

See also
 List of dancers
 List of dance personalities

References

External links
 

Living people
Indian male television actors
Indian male dancers
Indian contemporary dancers
Male actors from Indore
Indian male soap opera actors
Dancers from Madhya Pradesh
21st-century Indian male actors
1985 births